is a Japanese music composer and orchestrator who works for the video game development company Nintendo. He is most known for his collaborations with Koji Kondo in the Super Mario Galaxy series, along with Super Mario 3D World. Yokota served as an audio director at Koei prior to joining Nintendo in 2003.

Works
All works listed below were composed by Yokota unless otherwise noted.

References

Year of birth missing (living people)
21st-century conductors (music)
21st-century Japanese composers
21st-century Japanese male musicians
Japanese composers
Japanese conductors (music)
Japanese male composers
Living people
Mario (franchise) music
Nintendo people
Video game composers
Place of birth missing (living people)